Stewart Water Aerodrome  is located on the Portland Canal,  south of Stewart, British Columbia, Canada. It shares its airspace with the nearby Stewart Aerodrome and Hyder Seaplane Base, and its water runway in the Portland Canal exists on the Canada–United States border.

See also
Stewart Aerodrome

References

Seaplane bases in British Columbia
Regional District of Kitimat–Stikine
Registered aerodromes in British Columbia
Binational airports